Saddle Hill is the name of several places worldwide:

Saddle Hill (Aberdeenshire) in Aberdeenshire, Scotland
Saddle Hill (Monterrey) in Monterrey, México
Saddle Hill, New Zealand in Otago, New Zealand
Saddle Hill (Saint Kitts and Nevis) on the island of Nevis, Saint Kitts and Nevis
Saddle Hill, on the frontier between Quebec, Canada and Maine, USA